Clitocybe glacialis is a species of mushroom in the family Tricholomataceae. Formerly known as Lyophyllum montanum, this is a snowbank mushroom, always associated with melting snow along snowbanks and thus glacialis. Originally described by Alexander H. Smith in 1957, this North American species is typically found growing under conifers on mountains.

Taxonomy
The original specimen was collected in the Medicine Bow Mountains in Wyoming by mycologist Harry D. Thiers. In 1957, Alexander H. Smith, who had received the specimen from Thiers, described it as Lyophyllum montanum, placing it in the genus Lyophyllum because of its dark gray color and gills that became ash-gray  (cinereous) with age. However, it later became clear that this species lacked siderophilous granules—iron-absorbing particles that darken when heated in acetocarmine—a trait characteristic of other Lyophyllum species. For this reason, Redhead et al. in 2000 moved the species to the genus Clitocybe as C. glacialis (Clitocybe montana was already used). They speculated that the dark pigmentation may be an adaptation to protect against the higher levels of ultraviolet radiation present in their montane environments.

Description
The cap surface is initially a silvery-gray (defined as canescent), but becomes yellow or yellow-brown with age. Younger specimens may have a whitish surface bloom which may slough off in age.

The gills are gray or dark gray, and closely spaced together; the attachment to the stem is adnate (broadly attached to the stem slightly above the bottom of the gill) to almost free (unattached to the stem).

Microscopic characteristics
Viewed in deposit, such as with a spore print, the spores appear white. Microscopically, the spores are smooth-walled, elliptical or oblong, with dimensions of 5.5–7 by 3.5–4.5 µm.

Edibility
The species is categorized as edible. Its odor is pleasant, but its taste is not distinctive.

Similar species
Clitocybe albirhiza is a brown-colored mushroom with similar stature, but it may be distinguished by the white rhizomorphs at the base of its stem, as well as fibrils on the cap that are arranged in zones. Melanoleuca angelesiana is another species found in the same environment; mature specimens of both species resemble each other. They are easier to differentiate when young, however, as C. glacialis has a silvery-grey bloom that is lacking in M. angelesiana.

Habitat and distribution
This mushroom is found at high elevations from late May until early August. It is referred to as a snowbank mushroom because fruit bodies typically appear around the edges of melting snowbanks. The species has been found in various locales in North America, including Idaho, Oregon, Washington, Montana, and Alberta.

References

External links

glacialis
Fungi of North America
Snowbank fungi